Alan Sapper (18 March 1931 – 19 May 2006) was a British trade unionist.

Biography 
Born in Hammersmith, west London, Sapper studied at the Latymer Upper School, then worked as a botanist at Kew Gardens, while studying with the University of London External Programme.  He became active in the Institution of Professional Civil Servants, then in 1958 moved to work for the Association of Cinematograph, Television and Allied Technicians (ACTT), initially also undertaking scriptwriting.  He was General Secretary of the Writers' Guild of Great Britain from 1964, before returning to ACTT as General Secretary, serving until 1991, when the union merged with the Association of Broadcasting Staffs to form the Broadcasting Entertainment Cinematograph and Allied Trades Union (BECTU) of which he  was briefly Joint General Secretary.  He acquired a reputation for supporting militant action to defend technicians' pay and conditions, in particular in the ITV strike of 1979, where he secured an almost 30% pay rise.

He supported the proposal of some union members for the nationalisation of the British film industry (both as a socialist principle and as a means of providing financial stability for the rocky industry) and for the appointment of the first trade union researcher into discrimination against women (1974). He was strongly guided in both initiatives by the ACTT's research officer, Roy Lockett.

Sapper served as the President of the Trades Union Congress in 1982, and also as the President of the Confederation of Entertainment Unions and the International Federation of Audio Visual Workers.

Sapper's brother Laurie also became the leader of a trade union.

References

 
 

1931 births
2006 deaths
20th-century British businesspeople
20th-century English male writers
20th-century English screenwriters
Alumni of University of London Worldwide
Botanists active in Kew Gardens
English male screenwriters
English trade unionists
General secretaries of British trade unions
People educated at Latymer Upper School
People from Hammersmith
Presidents of the Trades Union Congress